Sonja (born Sonja Haraldsen; 4 July 1937) is Queen of Norway since 17 January 1991 as the wife of King Harald V.

Sonja and the then Crown Prince Harald had dated for nine years prior to their marriage in 1968. They had kept their relationship a secret due to the controversy of Sonja's status as a commoner. Harald had told his father, King Olav V, that he would remain unmarried if his father did not grant consent to marry Sonja. Upon their marriage, Sonja became crown princess and later the queen of Norway upon her husband's accession to the throne in 1991. The couple have two children together: Princess Märtha Louise and Crown Prince Haakon.

As queen, Sonja holds patronage with up to fifteen organisations. Sonja has also served as Vice President of the Norwegian Red Cross from 1987 to 1990. She is also known for her interest in music, art and culture, having founded the Queen Sonja International Music Competition and the Queen Sonja Print Award. She is also a graphic artist and ceramicist, with many of her works being featured in exhibitions across Norway and other countries.

Early life
Sonja Haraldsen was born on 4 July 1937 in Oslo, the daughter of clothing merchant Karl August Haraldsen (1875–1959) and Dagny Ulrichsen (1898–1994). She had three siblings, Haakon Haraldsen (1921–2016), Gry Henriksen (1924–1971) and Karl Herman Haraldsen (1929–1936, who died in a boating accident). She grew up at Tuengen Allé 1B in the district of Vinderen in Oslo and completed her lower secondary schooling in 1954. She received a diploma in dressmaking and tailoring at the Oslo Vocational School, and a diploma from École Professionnelle des Jeunes Filles (a finishing school) in Lausanne, Switzerland. There, she studied accounting, fashion design, and social science. She returned to Norway for further studies and received an undergraduate degree (French, English and Art History) from the University of Oslo.

Marriage
In June 1959 she first met Crown Prince Harald (the future King Harald V) at a party hosted by Johan H. Stenersen. Later in August the Crown Prince invited her to his graduation ball, where they were photographed together for the first time. They dated for nine years, although their relationship had been kept secret because she was a commoner. The Crown Prince made it clear to his father, King Olav V, that he would remain unmarried for life unless he could marry her. This would in effect have put an end to the rule of his family, and likely to the monarchy in Norway, as Harald was the sole heir to the throne. Faced with having to choose one of his relatives from the Danish royal family, the Dukes of Schleswig-Holstein or even the Grand Dukes of Oldenburg as his new heir in place of his son, Olav V consulted the government for advice; as a result, Sonja became engaged to Crown Prince Harald on 19 March 1968. The couple married on 29 August 1968, at Oslo Cathedral. She thus acquired the style of Royal Highness and the title of Crown Princess of Norway.

Public life

Following the death of King Olav V on 17 January 1991, Sonja became Norway's first queen consort in 52 years. Queen Sonja accompanied King Harald V when he swore his oath to uphold the Constitution in the Storting on 21 January 1991. During Haakon VII of Norway's reign, his wife Queen Maud died in 1938 and his son Olav V was then crown prince when his wife Princess Märtha of Sweden died in 1954 before he became king three years later. It was also the first time in 69 years that a Norwegian queen had been present in the Storting. Since his accession, Queen Sonja has accompanied the King to the formal opening of the autumn session of the Storting and the reading of the Speech from the Throne.

In accordance with their own wishes, the King and Queen were consecrated in Nidaros Cathedral in Trondheim on 23 June 1991. Following the consecration, the King and Queen conducted a 10-day tour of Southern Norway. In 1992, the entire Royal Family conducted a 22-day tour of Norway's four northernmost counties.

The Queen accompanies the King on official state visits abroad. She acts as the hostess when foreign heads of state officially visit Norway.

In 2005, Queen Sonja became the first queen ever to visit Antarctica. The Queen was there to open the Norwegian Troll research station in the country's Antarctic dependency, Queen Maud Land. The Queen flew in on one of the Royal Norwegian Air Force's C-130H Hercules transport aircraft, landing at Troll Airfield.

In 2017 Queen Sonja was awarded the Trysil-Knut Prize. She is the first woman to ever receive the award.<ref>Dronning Sonja får Trysil-Knut prisen  [h-a.no], retrieved 17 May 2018</ref>

The Queen was appointed a Rear Admiral in the Royal Norwegian Navy and a Brigadier in the Norwegian Army. She has undergone a basic officer training course and has participated in exercises.Article from the Norwegian defence on Royals in the military  (Norwegian)

On 17 January 2021, Queen Sonja celebrated 30 years as Norway's queen consort.

Activities
In 1972 she was involved in establishing Princess Märtha Louise's Fund, which provides assistance to disabled children in Norway. She has taken active part in large-scale initiatives to raise funds for international refugees and spent time in the 1970s visiting Vietnamese boat refugees in Malaysia.

From 1987 to 1990, Crown Princess Sonja served as Vice President of the Norwegian Red Cross. She was responsible for the organisation's international activities. She took part in a Red Cross delegation to Botswana and Zimbabwe in 1989.

Queen Sonja's School Award was established in 2006 and is awarded to schools who have "demonstrated excellence in its efforts to promote inclusion and equality".Article from the Norwegian Directorate of Education on Queen Sonja’s School Award  Retrieved 6 November 2007

In 2021, Frank Rossavik said that now she is starting an [art] gallery, to sell works by artists that she has given her prestigious prizes to.

Personal interests
Sonja established the Queen Sonja International Music Competition in 1988. It was originally for pianists, but in 1995 the competition became only for singers. The jury consists of diverse authoritative figures in opera and the winners receive a cash amount and prestigious engagements at Norwegian music institutions.Queen Sonja International Music Competition web page  Retrieved 2 September 2009

She is a longtime avid photographer and has a keen interest in art. She is a printmaker, and held exhibitions with artists Kjell Nupen and Ørnulf Opdahl in 2011 and 2013. The Queen Sonja Nordic Art Award was established in 2011 with Tiina Kivinen from Finland being the first recipient in 2012. The prize will be awarded every other year.

In 2017, The Queen Sonja Art Stable was opened, a venue which will function as a scene for arts and culture. Together with King Harald, the queen has for decades attempted to establish a palace museum in Oslo.

The Queen is a keen hiker, and this was marked by a sculpture unveiled for her 80th birthday as a gift from the Norwegian Trekking Association.

Issue

Arms

Honours

In 1982 she was awarded the Nansen Refugee Award. In 2007, she received the Holmenkollen medal with Simon Ammann, Frode Estil, Odd-Bjørn Hjelmeset, and her husband, King Harald V.

Queen Sonja also received an Honorary Doctorate from Heriot-Watt University in 1994 

 National orders 
 : Grand Cross with Collar of the Order of St. Olav °
 : Grand Cross of the Order of Merit °
 The Royal House Centenary Medal °
 Haakon VIIs Centenary Medal °
 Olav Vs Commemorative Medal of 30. January 1991 °
 Olav Vs Jubilee Medal 1957-1982 °
 Olav Vs Centenary Medal°
 Harald Vs Jubilee Medal 1991-2016 °
 Royal Family Order of King Olav V of Norway °
 Royal Family Order of King Harald V of Norway °
 Norwegian Red Cross Badge of Honour °
 The Nansen Medal °
 Oslo Military Society Badge of Honour in Gold °

 Foreign orders 
 : Grand Cross of the Order of May °
 : Grand Star of the Decoration of Honour for Services to the Republic of Austria (1978) °
 : Grand Cordon of the Order of Leopold °
 : Grand Cross of the Order of the Southern Cross °
 : Sash of the Order of the Balkan Mountains °
 : Grand Cross of the Order of Merit °
: Grand Order of Queen Jelena (12 May 2011)
 : Knight of the Order of the Elephant (12 February 1973) °
: Member 1st Class of the Order of the Cross of Terra Mariana (24 August 1998) °
: Member 1st Class of the Order of the White Star (2 September 2014)
: Commander Grand Cross of the Order of the White Rose of Finland °
 : Grand Cross of the Ordre national du Mérite
: Grand Cross Special Class of the Order of Merit of the Federal Republic of Germany °
 : Grand Cross of the Order of the Redeemer °
: Grand Cross of the Order of Merit of the Republic of Hungary °
 IOC: Recipient of the Gold Olympic Order °
: Grand Cross of the Order of the Falcon (21 October 1981) °
 : Knight Grand Cross of the Order of Merit of the Italian Republic (19 October 2001) °
 : Grand Cordon (Paulownia) of the Order of the Precious Crown °
 : Grand Cordon of the Supreme Order of the Renaissance ° (Order of Al-Nahda)
 : Commander Grand Cros of the Order of the Three Stars (2 September 1998) °
 : Recipient of the 1st Class of Cross of Recognition (12 March 2015) °
 : Grand Cross of the Order of Vytautas the Great (3 September 1998)  °
 : Grand Cross of the Order of Adolph of Nassau °
 : Grand Cross of the Order of the Gold Lion of the House of Nassau °
 : Knight Grand Cross of the Order of the Netherlands Lion °
 : Grand Cross of the Order of the Crown °
 : Recipient of Queen Beatrix's Inauguration Medal °
 : Knight of the Order of the White Eagle °
 : Grand Cross of the Order of Merit of Portugal (2 January 1981) °
 : Grand Cross of the Order of Infante Dom Henrique (13 February 2004) °
 : Grand Cross of the Order of Christ (26 May 2008) °
 : Member 2nd Class of the Order of the White Double Cross (2010)
 : Member of the Order for Exceptional Merits (2011) °
 :  Member 1st Class (Grand Gwanghwa Medal) of the Order of Diplomatic Service Merit °
 : Dame Grand Cross of the Order of Charles III (21 April 1995) °
 : Dame Grand Cross of the Order of Isabella the Catholic (12 April 1982) °
 : Member Grand Cross of the Royal Order of the Seraphim °
: Recipient of the 50th Birthday Badge Medal of King Carl XVI Gustaf (30 April 1996)
 : Recipient of the Ruby Jubilee Badge Medal of King Carl XVI Gustaf (15 September 2013)Rem : The mark ° shows the honours mentioned on Queen Sonja's official website page''

Notes

References

2007 Holmenkollen medalists announced - Accessed 18 March 2007. 
Holmenkollen medal presented to Estil and Hjelmeset - Accessed 21 March 2007

External links
Royal House web page on the Queen
Queens childhood home split and being moved

1937 births
Living people
Norwegian expatriates in Switzerland
Holmenkollen medalists
House of Glücksburg (Norway)
Norwegian royal consorts
Crown Princesses of Norway
Norwegian Lutherans
Norwegian Army generals
Royal Norwegian Navy admirals
Grand Cordons of the Order of the Precious Crown
Dames Grand Cross of the Order of Isabella the Catholic
Knights Grand Cross of the Order of the Falcon
Grand Cross of the Ordre national du Mérite
Grand Crosses of the Order of Christ (Portugal)
Grand Crosses of the Order of the Crown (Netherlands)
Grand Crosses of the Order of Merit (Portugal)
Grand Crosses of the Order of Prince Henry
Recipients of the Grand Star of the Decoration for Services to the Republic of Austria
Grand Crosses of the Order of Vytautas the Great
Grand Crosses of the Order of Merit of the Republic of Hungary (civil)
Recipients of the Order of the Cross of Terra Mariana, 1st Class
Recipients of the Olympic Order
Norwegian printmakers
Grand Crosses Special Class of the Order of Merit of the Federal Republic of Germany
Recipients of the Cross of Recognition
Recipients of the Order of the White Star, 1st Class
Recipients of the Order of the White Eagle (Poland)
20th-century Norwegian women
21st-century Norwegian women
Princesses by marriage
Nansen Refugee Award laureates